The Bird River greenstone belt is an Archean greenstone belt in southeastern Manitoba, Canada.

See also
Volcanism of Canada
Volcanism of Western Canada
List of greenstone belts

References

Volcanism of Manitoba
Greenstone belts
Archean volcanism